Bimba or BIMBA may refer to:

People
 Anthony Bimba (1894-1982), Lithuanian-American radical journalist and historian
 Bhima of Mahikavati, 13th century Indian king, also known as Bimba Shah
 Manuel dos Reis Machado (1899-1984), Brazilian martial artist
 Ricardo Winicki, Brazilian sailor at the 2007 Pan American Games

Other uses
 Beijing International MBA at Peking University (BiMBA), a Peking University business school 
 Juan Bimba, a fictional personification of Venezuela
 bimba fruit, Coccinia grandis